Lyman W. Porter (1930-2015) was an American academic administrator. He was the dean of the Paul Merage School of Business at the University of California, Irvine from 1972 to 1983. He was the co-author of many books of management, and "one of the primary founders of the study of organizational behavior."

Early life
Lyman William Porter was born in 1930 in Lafayette, Indiana. His father, Lyman C. Porter, was a professor of biology at Purdue University.

Porter graduated from Northwestern University, where he earned a bachelor's degree in 1952, and he received a Ph.D. in psychology from Yale University in 1956.

Career
Porter began his career in the Psychology department at the University of California, Berkeley. He joined the University of California, Irvine as assistant dean of its Paul Merage School of Business in 1967, and served as the dean from 1972 to 1983.

Porter was the president of the Society for Industrial and Organizational Psychology from 1975 to 1976. With Mark Rosenzweig, he was the co-editor of the Annual Review of Psychology from 1974 to 1994. He was a founding trustee of the American University of Armenia.

Porter was "one of the primary founders of the study of organizational behavior," and he "played a major role in ensuring that organizational behavior would become an important component of modern business education." He retired from academia in 1992.

Personal life, death and legacy
Porter married Meredith Anne; they had one son and a daughter. They resided in Newport Beach, California.

Porter died on July 2, 2015, in Newport Beach, California, at the age of 85. He is the namesake of the Dr. Lyman W. Porter Colloquium Room  at UC Irvine.

Selected works

References

External links
Lyman Porter Tribute at the Paul Merage School of Business on YouTube

1930 births
2015 deaths
People from Lafayette, Indiana
People from Newport Beach, California
Northwestern University alumni
Yale University alumni
University of California, Berkeley faculty
University of California, Irvine faculty
Business school deans
Annual Reviews (publisher) editors